Razliq Rural District is in the Central District of Sarab County, East Azerbaijan province, Iran. At the National Census of 2006, its population was 10,812 in 2,628 households. There were 10,040 inhabitants in 2,843 households at the following census of 2011. At the most recent census of 2016, the population of the rural district was 9,183 in 2,830 households. The largest of its 29 villages was Qaleh Juq, with 2,129 people.

References 

Sarab County

Rural Districts of East Azerbaijan Province

Populated places in East Azerbaijan Province

Populated places in Sarab County